Chinese as a foreign or second language is when non-native speakers study Chinese varieties. The increased interest in China from those outside has led to a corresponding interest in the study of Standard Chinese (a type of Mandarin Chinese) as a foreign language, the official language of mainland China, Taiwan and Singapore. However, the teaching of Chinese both within and outside China is not a recent phenomenon. Westerners began learning different Chinese varieties in the 16th century. Within China, Mandarin became the official language in the early 20th century. Mandarin also became the official language of Taiwan when the Kuomintang took over control from Japan after World War II.

In 2010, 750,000 people (670,000 from overseas) took the Chinese Proficiency Test. For comparison, in 2005, 117,660 non-native speakers took the test, an increase of 26.52% from 2004. From 2000 to 2004, the number of students in England, Wales and Northern Ireland taking Advanced Level exams in Chinese increased by 57%. An independent school in the UK made Chinese one of their compulsory subjects for study in 2006. The study of Chinese is also rising in the United States. The USC U.S.-China Institute cited a report that 51,582 students were studying the language in US colleges and universities. While far behind the more than 800,000 students who study Spanish, the number is more than three times higher than in 1986. The Institute's report includes graphs and details on the popularity of other languages.

As of 2008, China had helped 60,000 teachers promote its language internationally, and an estimated 40 million people were studying Chinese as a second language around the world.

Other than Standard Mandarin, Cantonese is also widely taught as a foreign language. It is the official language of Hong Kong and Macau and has traditionally been the dominant language among most Overseas Chinese communities. A number of universities outside Hong Kong and Macau offer Cantonese within their Chinese-language departments as well, especially in the UK and North America. Taiwanese Hokkien is taught at the International Chinese Language Program, Taipei Language Institute and other schools.

History

The interpretation of the Chinese language in the West began with some misunderstandings. Since the earliest appearance of Chinese characters in the West, the belief that written Chinese was ideographic prevailed. Such a belief led to Athanasius Kircher's conjecture that Chinese characters were derived from the Egyptian hieroglyphs, China being a colony of Egypt. John Webb, the British architect, went a step further. In a Biblical vein similar to Kircher's, he tried to demonstrate that Chinese was the Primitive or Adamic language. In his An Historical Essay Endeavoring a Probability That the Language of the Empire of China Is the Primitive Language (1669), he suggested that Chinese was the language spoken before the confusion of tongues.

Inspired by these ideas, Leibniz and Bacon, among others, dreamt of inventing a characteristica universalis modelled on Chinese. Thus wrote Bacon:

Leibniz placed high hopes on the Chinese characters:

The serious study of the language in the West began with missionaries coming to China during the late 16th century. Among the first were the Italian Jesuits, Michele Ruggieri and Matteo Ricci. They mastered the language without the aid of any grammar books or dictionaries, and are often viewed as the first Western sinologists. Ruggieri set up a school in Macau, which was the first for teaching foreigners Chinese and translated part of the Great Learning into Latin. This was the first translation of a Confucian classic into any European language. He also wrote a religious tract in Chinese, the first Chinese book written by a Westerner. Matteo Ricci brought Western sciences to China, and became a prolific Chinese writer. With his wide command of the language, Ricci impressed the Chinese literati and was accepted as one of them, much to the advantage of his missionary work. Several scientific works he authored or co-authored were collected in the Siku Quanshu, the imperial collection of Chinese classics. Some of his religious works were listed in the collection's bibliography, but not collected.

Ricci and Ruggieri, with the help of the Chinese Jesuit Lay Brother Sebastiano Fernandez (also spelled Fernandes; 1562–1621), are thought to have created the first Portuguese-Chinese dictionary some time between 1583 and 1588. Later, while travelling on the Grand Canal of China from Beijing to Linqing during the winter of 1598, Ricci, with the help of Lazzaro Cattaneo (1560–1640) and Sebastiano Fernandez, also compiled a Chinese-Portuguese dictionary. In this latter work, thanks to Cattaneo's musical ear, a system was introduced for marking the tones of romanized Chinese syllables with diacritical marks. The distinction between aspirated and unaspirated consonants was also made clear through the use of apostrophes, as in the much later Wade-Giles system. Although neither of the two dictionaries were published—the former only came to light in the Vatican Secret Archives in 1934, and saw publication in 2001, while the later has not been found so far—Ricci made the transcription system developed in 1598, and in 1626 it was finally published, with minor modifications, by another Jesuit Nicolas Trigault in a guide for new Jesuit missionaries. The system continued to be in wide use throughout the 17th and 18th century. It can be seen in several Romanized Chinese texts (prepared mostly by Michael Boym and his Chinese collaborators) that appeared in Athanasius Kircher's China Illustrata.

The earliest Chinese grammars were produced by the Spanish Dominican missionaries. The earliest surviving one is by Francisco Varo (1627–1687). His Arte de la Lengua Mandarina was published in Canton in 1703. This grammar was only sketchy, however. The first important Chinese grammar was Joseph Henri Marie de Prémare's Notitia linguae sinicae, completed in 1729 but only published in Malacca in 1831. Other important grammar texts followed, from Jean-Pierre Abel-Rémusat's Élémens (sic) de la grammaire chinoise in 1822 to Georg von der Gabelentz's Chinesische Grammatik in 1881. Glossaries for Chinese circulated among the missionaries from early on. Robert Morrison's A Dictionary of the Chinese Language (1815-1823), noted for its fine printing, is one of the first important Chinese dictionaries for the use of Westerners.

Due to the status of Guangzhou as the only Chinese port open to foreign trade and exchange in the 1700s, Cantonese became the variety of Chinese that came into the most interaction with the Western world in early modern times. Foreign works on Chinese were largely centered around this variant until the opening up of other Chinese regions for commerce through unequal treaties, which exposed European scholars to a much larger number of Chinese varieties.

In 1814, a chair of Chinese and Manchu was founded at the Collège de France, and Abel-Rémusat became the first Professor of Chinese in Europe. In 1837, Nikita Bichurin opened the first European Chinese-language school in the Russian Empire. Since then sinology became an academic discipline in the West, with the secular sinologists outnumbering the missionary ones. Some of the big names in the history of linguistics took up the study of Chinese. Sir William Jones dabbled in it; instigated by Abel-Rémusat, Wilhelm von Humboldt studied the language seriously, and discussed it in several letters with the French professor.

Local Chinese variants were still widely used up until a Qing dynasty decree in 1909 that mandated Mandarin as the official language of China. After this period, only Cantonese and Mandarin remained as the most influential variants of Chinese, the former due to the importance of maritime trade in Guangzhou and the emergence of Hong Kong as a key economy in East Asia. Chinese departments in the West were largely centered on Cantonese due to British colonial rule over Hong Kong until the opening of communist-ruled China starting in the 1970s.

The teaching of Chinese as a foreign language in the People's Republic of China started in 1950 at Tsinghua University, initially serving students from Eastern Europe. Starting with Bulgaria in 1952, China also dispatched Chinese teachers abroad, and by the early 1960s had sent teachers afar as the Congo, Cambodia, Yemen and France. In 1962, with the approval of the State Council, the Higher Preparatory School for Foreign Students was set up, later renamed the Beijing Language and Culture University. The programs were disrupted for several years during the Cultural Revolution.

According to the Chinese Ministry of Education, there are 330 institutions teaching Mandarin Chinese as a foreign language, receiving about 40,000 foreign students. In addition, there are almost 5,000 Chinese language teachers. Since 1992 the State Education Commission has managed a Chinese language proficiency exam program, which tests has been taken around 100 million times (including by domestic ethnic minority candidates).

Within China's Guangdong Province, Cantonese is also offered in some schools as optional or extra-curricular courses in select Chinese-as-a-foreign-language programs, although many require students to be proficient in Mandarin first.

Difficulty
Chinese is rated as one of the most difficult languages to learn for people whose native language is English, together with Arabic, Japanese and Korean. According to the Foreign Service Institute, a native English speaker needs over 2,200 hours of intensive study, taking 88 weeks (one year and about 8 months), to learn Mandarin. A quote attributed to William Milne, Morrison's colleague, goes that learning Chinese is

Two major difficulties stand out: characters and tones.

Characters

While English uses an alphabet, Chinese uses hanzi, or Chinese characters, as its writing system. The Kangxi dictionary contains 47,035 characters. However, most of the characters contained there are archaic and obscure. The Chart of Common Characters of Modern Chinese, promulgated in the People's Republic of China, lists 2,500 common characters and 1,000 less-than-common characters, while the Chart of Generally Utilized Characters of Modern Chinese lists 7,000 characters, including the 3,500 characters already listed above.

In his 1991 article "Why Chinese is So Damn Hard", David Moser states that an English speaker would find the "ridiculous" writing system "unreasonably hard to learn" to the level of achieving literacy due to the large number of characters. Moser argued that he was unable to "comfortably read" a newspaper even though he knew 2,000 characters.

The 17th-century Protestant theologian Elias Grebniz, said that Chinese characters were:

In Gautier's novella Fortunio, a Chinese professor from the Collège de France, when asked by the protagonist to translate a love letter suspected to be written in Chinese, replied that the characters in the letter happen to all belong to that half of the 40,000 characters which he has yet to master.

The overwhelming majority of characters contain phonetic parts, but their use is complicated by several factors. First, Chinese characters have been in use for longer than English was written and yet saw very little orthographic reform to align them with how Chinese changed over time. Two, in mainland China phonetic parts were removed from some characters in order to make handwriting faster. Three, there are characters that have different readings depending on the word. The Japanese writing system suffers from the same issues.

Tones
Mandarin Chinese has four tones, namely the first tone (flat or high level tone, 阴平, denoted by " ¯ " in Pinyin), the second tone (rising or high-rising tone, 阳平, denoted by " ˊ " in Pinyin), the third tone (falling-rising or low tone, 上声, denoted by " ˇ " in Pinyin), and the fourth tone (falling or high-falling tone, 去声, denoted by " ˋ " in Pinyin). There is also a fifth tone called neutral (轻声, denoted as no-mark in Pinyin) although the official name of the tones is Four Tones. Many other Chinese dialects have more, for example, Cantonese has six (often numbered as nine, but three are duplicates). In most Western languages, tones are only used to express emphasis or emotion, not to distinguish meanings as in Chinese. A French Jesuit, in a letter, relates how the Chinese tones cause a problem for understanding:

Moser also stated that tones were a contributing factor to the difficulty of learning Chinese, partly because it is difficult for non-native learners to use Chinese intonation whilst retaining the correct tones.

Sources of education

Chinese courses have been blooming internationally since 2000 at every level of education. Still, in most of the Western universities, the study of the Chinese language is only a part of Chinese Studies or sinology, instead of an independent discipline. The teaching of Chinese as a foreign language is known as duiwai hanyu jiaoxue. The Confucius Institute, supervised by Hanban (the National Office For Teaching Chinese as a Foreign Language), promotes the Chinese language in the West and other parts of the world.

The People's Republic of China began to accept foreign students from the communist countries (in Eastern Europe, Asia and Africa) from the 1950s onwards. Foreign students were forced to leave the PRC during the Cultural Revolution. Taiwan has long been a place for students to study Mandarin. Popular choices for Westerners who want to study Chinese abroad include the Beijing Language and Culture University in Beijing, the Mandarin Training Center (MTC) and International Chinese Language Program (ICLP, formerly the Stanford Center) in Taiwan, and the Chinese University of Hong Kong.

Many online courses in Standard Mandarin, Standard Cantonese and some other varieties are available through commercial, governmental and nonprofit websites catering to speakers of English and over a hundred other languages. Free and Paid-for courses are also offered via podcasts. Software is also available to help students pronounce, read and translate Chinese into English and other languages.

Teaching the varieties of Chinese to non-native speakers is discouraged by the laws of the People's Republic of China.

In Malaysia, Singapore and Brunei, some Bumiputera and Indian sent their children to Chinese primary school.

Notable non-native speakers of Chinese

 Viktor Axelsen: Danish national badminton player
 Kenji Doihara: Japanese general and World War II war criminal
 Ai Fukuhara: Japanese national table-tennis player
 Ronald Graham: American mathematician
 James Kynge: British, a regular commentator on Chinese and Asian issues.
 John Rabe: German businessman, saved thousands of Chinese people from slaughter during the Nanking massacre.
 Sidney Rittenberg: American interpreter, Communist and businessman
 Sagnik Roy: Indian businessman
 Katharine Gun: British intelligence agent
 Richard Sorge: Soviet spy
 George Thomas Staunton: English traveller, Orientalist and translator
 Adam von Trott zu Solz: German diplomat and participant in the German resistance to Nazism
 James Veneris: American Korean War veteran; settled in Shandong province after the war
 Ruth Weiss: Austrian-born Chinese-naturalized journalist
 Bob Woodruff: American television journalist, ABC News
 Mark Zuckerberg: American businessman, founder of Facebook
 Thinaah Muralitharan: Malaysian of Indian descent badminton player

Politicians, government servants and nobility
 Cecil Clementi: Governor of Hong Kong from 1925–30 
 Cường Để: Vietnamese prince
 Elsie Elliott: British-born Hong Kong politician
 Timothy Geithner: United States Secretary of the Treasury
 W. Michael Blumenthal: United States Secretary of the Treasury
 Henrik, Prince Consort of Denmark: Danish prince consort
 Herbert Hoover: US president (limited use)
 Ho Chi Minh: Vietnamese revolutionary
 Jon Huntsman, Jr.: US Ambassador to China; former Governor of Utah.
 Banri Kaieda: Japanese politician and former leader of the DPJ
 Kim Il-sung: North Korean leader
 Karim Massimov: Kazakh Prime Minister
 Park Geun-hye: South Korean President
 Matthew Pottinger: US politician and Deputy National Security Advisor
 Kevin Rudd: former Prime Minister of Australia
 Princess Maha Chakri Sirindhorn: Thai crown princess
 Mulatu Teshome: Ethiopian President
 Kassym-Jomart Tokayev: Kazakh President
 Alice Weidel: German politician
 Barbara Woodward: English diplomat and permanent representative to the United Nations

Educators, historians, linguists and writers
 Frederick W. Baller: British missionary, linguist, translator, educator and sinologist
 Pearl S. Buck: American novelist, author of The Good Earth, winner of the Nobel Prize in Literature
 John DeFrancis: American linguist
 Arif Dirlik: Turkish historian
 Wolfram Eberhard: German sociologist
 Peter Hessler: American writer and journalist 
 Bernhard Karlgren: Swedish sinologist
 George Kennedy: American sinologist and developer of Yale romanization
 Joseph Needham: English sinologist
 Stephen Owen: American sinologist and literary analyst
 Phan Bội Châu: Vietnamese scholar and nationalist
 Vikram Seth: Indian academic
 Sidney Shapiro: American translator; acquired Chinese citizenship.
 Gary Snyder: American poet and essayist. Winner of the Pulitzer Prize for Poetry.
 Ezra Vogel: American academic
 Samuel Wells Williams: American missionary, linguist, and diplomat

Missionaries
 L. Nelson Bell: American Missionary father-in-law of Billy Graham
 John Birch: American missionary and namesake of the John Birch Society
 Walter Henry Medhurst: British missionary and translator
 Timothy Richard: American Baptist missionary
 Samuel Isaac Joseph Schereschewsky: Russian-born Bishop of Shanghai
 Hudson Taylor: British missionary and founder of the China Inland Mission

Actors, entertainers and cultural performers
 Shila Amzah: International multi-award winning Malaysian singer-songwriter
 Sola Aoi: Japanese model and actress
 Jessica Beinecke: American entertainer and host of online show OMG Meiyu
 Vanessa Branch: English American actress
 John Cena: American professional wrestler
 Dashan: Canadian stage performer famous in China
 Thomas Derksen: German-born online celebrity active in China
 Raz Gal-Or: Israeli businessman and online celebrity active in China
 William Hootkins: American actor
 Im Jin-ah: South Korean singer and actress
 Dimash Kudaibergen: Kazakh singer and lyricist
 Ladybeard: Australian cross-dressing entertainer
 Jeff Locker: American television host active in Taiwan
 Michiko Nishiwaki: Japanese actress
 Mira Sorvino: American actress
 Ryo Takeuchi: Japanese film director
 Abigail Washburn: American musician; singer, banjo player; performs in China and in the US
 Leehom Wang: American-born singer, ethnic Han, but didn't learn Chinese until 18
Oh Hyuk: South Korean singer, songwriter and main vocal of Band Hyukoh
Kim Go-eun: South Korean actress
Jeon Hyun-moo: South Korean announcer and performer
Dean Fujioka: Japanese actor, musician, model

See also 
 Language teaching
 Chinese school
 Test of Chinese as a Foreign Language

References

Further reading
 Chen, Chung-yu. "Mandarin Chinese as a Heritage Language: A Case Study of U.S.-born Taiwanese" (master's thesis in applied linguistics). University of California, 2013.
 
 
 Wu, Hsu-pai. "Teachers’ Perspectives on Chinese Culture Integration and Culturally Relevant Pedagogy in Teaching Chinese as a Heritage Language: A Multiple-Case Study" (Archive) (PhD thesis). University of Texas. May 2011.

 Hoa Ngu Phuong Nam Center."Hoa Ngu Phuong Nam" (master's thesis in applied linguistics). Center of VietNam, 2021.
 Hoa Ngu Tam Nhin Viet Center."Hoa Ngu Tam Nhin Viet" (master's thesis in applied linguistics). Center of VietNam, 2021.
 Tieng Trung Hanzi."Chinese Hanzi" (master's thesis in applied linguistics). Center of VietNam, 2021.
 Tieng Trung Thanhmaihsk."Tieng Trung Thanhmaihsk" (master's thesis in applied linguistics). Center of VietNam, 2021.
 Tieng Trung Phượng Hoàng."Tieng Trung Phượng Hoàng" (master's thesis in applied linguistics). Center of VietNam, 2021.

Sinology
Chinese-language education